Pecten jacobaeus, the Mediterranean scallop, is a species of scallop, an edible saltwater scallop, a marine bivalve mollusc in the family Pectinidae, the scallops.

Description
The two valves have different shapes. The lower valve, with which the animal rests on the bottom, is very convex and light-colored, while the upper valve is flat and brown. They show 14 to 16 ribs (radial wrinkles) with a more or less rectangular cross section. The inside of the valves is porcelain-like smooth.

The mollusc has at the edge of the mantle many short tentacles, between which there are a total of 60 blue-millimeter lens eyes. By quickly closing of the two valves it can swim away several meters in case of danger.

These scallops eat planktonic organisms and other floating food particles, which they obtain by filtering sea water with their gills.

Distribution
This species appears to be endemic to the Mediterranean Sea, but it may be conspecific with Pecten maximus, the great scallop, which has a larger distribution. Although these two species are morphologically similar, they present distinguishing features.

Fossils of Pecten jacobaeus first appear at the beginning of the Pliocene and are quite common in the Pliocene and Pleistocene deposits of Italy.

Commercial value
Scallops of this species are collected commercially for human consumption using such techniques as the Rapido trawl.

Popular culture
In a Christian context, this species is considered to be the scallop which is traditionally associated with Saint James, also known as James, son of Zebedee, also known as Saint Jacob, hence the specific name jacobaeus. It is also known as the "Pilgrim's scallop", as the shells were used by the pilgrims in the Middle Ages as a cup.

See also
 Symbolism of scallop shells

References

 C. Linnaeus. 1758. Systema Naturae per Regna Tria Naturae, secundum Classes, Ordines, Genera, Species, cum Characteribus, Differentiis, Synonymis, Locis. Tomus I. Editio decima, reformata. Laurentii Salvii, Holmiae (Lars Salvius, Stockholm)
 Guido T. Poppe und Y. Goto: European Seashells. Vol II (Scaphopoda, Bivalvia, Cephalopoda). 221 S., Verlag Christa Hemmen, Wiesbaden, 1993

External links

Pectinidae
Molluscs of the Mediterranean Sea
Molluscs described in 1758
Taxa named by Carl Linnaeus